Frozen Pool is an album by Christina Rosenvinge.  It was released on January 16, 2001 on Smells Like Records.

Track listing
1. Hunter's Lullaby    
2. Expensive Shoes   
3. White Ape    
4. Frozen Pool   
5. Taking Off  
6. Muertos o algo Mejor      
7. As the Wind Blows      
8. Green Room     
9. Glue     
10. Seems So Long Ago, Nancy

References

2001 albums